The 2018–19 Purdue Boilermakers men's basketball team represented Purdue University in the 2018–19 NCAA Division I men's basketball season. Their head coach was Matt Painter in his 14th season with the Boilers. The team played their home games at Mackey Arena in West Lafayette, Indiana as members of the Big Ten Conference. With a win over Northwestern on March 9, 2019, the Boilermakers clinched a share of the Big Ten regular season championship, the school's 24th championship. They finished the season 26–10, 16–4 in Big Ten play to win a share of the Big Ten regular season championship, the school's conference-record 24th championship. As the No. 2 seed in the Big Ten tournament, they were upset by Minnesota in the quarterfinals. The received an at-large bid to the NCAA tournament as the No. 3 seed in the South region. They defeated Old Dominion in the First Round before beating defending champion Villanova to advance to the Sweet Sixteen. In the Sweet Sixteen, they defeated Tennessee in overtime to advance to the Elite Eight. There they lost to No. 1 seed Virginia in overtime.

On October 12, 2018, Purdue signed Matt Painter to a rolling two-year contract extension, through the 2023–24 season. Following the conclusion of the regular season, Painter was named the Big Ten Coach of the Year.

Previous season
The Boilermakers finished the 2017–18  season with a record thirty wins (30-7), 15–3 in Big Ten play to finish in a tie for second place. As the No. 3 seed in the Big Ten tournament, they defeated Rutgers and Penn State before losing to Michigan in the championship game. They received an at-large bid to the NCAA tournament as the No. 2 seed in the East region. They defeated Cal State Fullerton in the First Round, but lost starting center Isaac Haas to a fractured elbow. Without Haas, they defeated Butler in the Second Round to advance to the Sweet Sixteen where they lost to No. 3 seed Texas Tech.

Offseason

Departures 
On March 26, 2018, sophomore guard Carsen Edwards announced he would enter the NBA draft, but would not sign with an agent. Edwards withdrew his name from the draft and returned for his junior season. On April 20, freshman Nojel Eastern announced he would also test the waters of the NBA draft without signing with an agent. Eastern also withdrew his name from the draft and returned to school.

Purdue lost four team members to graduation and one to transfer.

Incoming transfers

2018 recruiting class

Roster

Schedule and results
The 2018–19 season will mark the first time in Big Ten history that the teams will play a 20-game conference schedule, setting a precedent for all Division I basketball. The new schedule will also include a regional component to increase the frequency of games among teams in similar areas. Over the course of a six-year cycle (12 playing opportunities), in-state rivals will play each other 12 times, regional opponents will play 10 times, and all other teams will play nine times. Three in-state series will be guaranteed home-and-homes: Illinois and Northwestern, Indiana and Purdue, and Michigan and Michigan State will always play twice. Purdue announced a home and home series with Texas on May 17, 2018 to be played in Austin in 2018 and in West Lafayette in 2019.

|-
!colspan=9 style=|Exhibition

|-
!colspan=9 style=|Regular season

|-
!colspan=9 style=|Big Ten tournament

|-
!colspan=9 style=|<span style=>NCAA tournament

Rankings

*AP does not release post-NCAA Tournament rankings^Coaches did not release a Week 2 poll.

References

Purdue Boilermakers men's basketball seasons
Purdue
Purdue
Purdue
Purdue